Paul Robinson (born 24 May 1991) is an Irish middle-distance runner competing primarily in the 1500 metres. He represented his country in the 800 metres at the 2013 World Championships without advancing from the first round. In addition, he finished fourth at the 2014 European Championships.

International competitions

Personal bests
Outdoor
800 metres – 1:45.86 (Dublin 2013)
1000 metres – 2:17.93 (Ostrava 2014)
1500 metres – 3:35.22 (Rieti 2013)
One mile – 3:54.77 (Oslo 2014)
3000 metres – 7:58.56 (Glendale 2014)
5000 metres – 13:54.34 (Glendale 2013)
Indoor
1000 metres – 2:27.38 (Ostrava 2014)
1500 metres – 3:39.36 (Val-de-Reuil 2021)
One mile – 4:02.77 (Athlone 2017)
3000 metres – 8:09.79 (Abbotstown 2019)

References

1991 births
Living people
Irish male middle-distance runners
World Athletics Championships athletes for Ireland